Baldwin v Brighton and Hove City Council [2007] IRLR 232 is a UK labour law case, concerning gender discrimination and the implied term of mutual trust and confidence.

Facts
Andy Baldwin underwent gender reassignment while working in a temporary post as Lesbian Gay and Bisexual Community Safety Development Officer with Brighton and Hove City Council. He changed his name after December 2002 to Andy. Also in December, the temporary post ended because funding ran out, but the appointment was extended to January 2003 to let him apply for a new post. On 24 January he resigned, and claimed for sex discrimination under s 2A SDA 1975 because he alleged that a Reverend David Miller, who had been appointed as a member of the panel interviewing for alternative posts, was transphobic. Mr Andy Baldwin also claimed for constructive unfair dismissal because in permitting a discriminatory work environment with an unfair selection procedure the employer breached the implied term of mutual trust and confidence.

Judgment

Employment Tribunal
The Employment tribunal held the interview panel member did not know Mr Baldwin was transsexual, and just being a panel member did not mean that he had ‘treated’ the Mr Baldwin in any way. Mr Baldwin resigned because the alternative post was inferior.

Employment Appeal Tribunal
Judge Peter Clark held the tribunal was right, because without knowledge of the transsexuality, the panel member was not treating Mr Baldwin in any way special, and it was not enough under s 2A SDA 1975 that he ‘would’ have been treated less favourably. He could not rely on his own perception that the panel might be biased against him.
Similarly there was no breach of mutual trust and confidence because the employers had no knowledge of the gender reassignment at the relevant time. So appointing some allegedly transphobic could not be conduct ‘calculated and likely’ to destroy mutual trust and confidence (the use of the word ‘and’ though, should have been ‘or’ in Mahmoud and Malik v BCCI SA). Judge Peter Clarke explained his reasoning for the case's failure as follows.

See also
Wilson v Racher

Notes

External links
 Judgment on BAILII
Andy Baldwin's blog
Cobham Presbyterian Church and Reverend David Miller's sermon list
'Transsexuals are 'vermin' claim' (17.11.2005) The Argus
'Transsexuals are 'vermin' claim' Archived from The Argus (17.11.2005)

Employment Appeal Tribunal cases
Brighton and Hove City Council
21st century in Brighton and Hove
United Kingdom LGBT rights case law
Transgender case law in the United Kingdom
2006 in British case law
Labour case law
2000s in LGBT history